Dushyant Singh Chautala (born 3 April 1988) is an Indian politician from Jannayak Janta Party serving as the 6th deputy Chief Minister of Haryana since 2019. He is the president and co-founder of the Jannayak Janata Party since 2018.He is former member of Indian National Lok Dal till 2018. He represents Uchana Kalan constituency in Haryana Legislative Assembly since 2019.He was a member of Lok Sabha from Hisar from 2014 to 2019.In 2019 MP election he lost his seat to BJP.  Dushyant was also the Executive Member of Indian Olympic Association since 2019 and the President of Table Tennis Federation of India since 2017.

Early life and education 
Dushyant Chautala was born in Daroli, Hisar District, Haryana, on 3 April 1988 to Ajay Chautala and Naina Singh Chautala. He is the grandson of Om Prakash Chautala and the great grandson of former Deputy Prime Minister Chaudhary Devi Lal. He has a younger brother, Digvijay Chautala. He comes from one of the political dynasties of Haryana and his family belongs to the Jat community.

Dushyant Chautala completed his initial schooling from St. Mary School, Hisar and The Lawrence School, Sanawar, Himachal Pradesh. He completed his B.Sc., (Business Administration) (Management), from California State University, Bakersfield, California, USA. He has done 'Masters of Law' from National Law University, Delhi. He married Meghna Chautala on 18 April 2017.

Political career 
In 2014 Lok Sabha Elections, Dushyant Chautala defeated  Kuldeep Bishnoi of the Haryana Janhit Congress (BL) by a margin of 31,847 votes to become the youngest ever elected Member of the Parliament for which he holds a record in the 'Limca Book of Records'. In 2017, Chautala became the first Indian to be conferred with the highest civilian honor by the Cooperation Commission of Arizona, USA.

On 9 December 2018, Dushyant Chautala launched the new party Jannayak Janata Party (JJP) after differences in the family led to his expulsion from Indian National Lok Dal.

Jannayak Janata Party formation 
Jannayak Janata Party was formed by supporters of Dushyant Chautala in Jind, Haryana on 9 December 2018.  The name of JJP party was inspired from the legacy of former Deputy Prime Minister of India,
Chaudhary Devi Lal, who was often respectfully referred to as "Jan Nayak" or people's leader.

Dushyant Chautala was in a turf war over leadership of the Indian National Lok Dal (INLD) with his uncle Abhay Chautala. Matters came to a head when Abhay Chautala dissolved the student wing of the INLD, the INSO, which triggered Dushyant to announce the formation of the JJP. Youth employment, senior citizen pension, fair support price for farmers, and women safety are the main issues of JJP.

Under the leadership of Dushyant Chautala, Jannayak Janata Party fought its first election for Jind legislative assembly seat by-election. In the Jind by-election, JJP got 37631 votes and secured the second position.

Positions held as a Member of Parliament 
Chautala was a Member, Standing Committee on Urban Development, 2014–2016. He was also a Member, Consultative Committee, Ministry of Skill Development and Entrepreneurship, 2015-2018; and a Member, Standing Committee on Commerce, 2016-2019.

Positions held in Sports Associations 
Chautala holds the position of President, Table Tennis Federation of India. He also is a Member, Executive Council, Indian Olympic Association.

See also
 Devi Lal
 Dynastic politics of Haryana

References

1988 births
Living people
Indian Hindus
California State University, Bakersfield alumni
Chautala family
Indian National Lok Dal politicians
Jannayak Janta Party politicians
Deputy chief ministers of Haryana
Lok Sabha members from Haryana
People from Sirsa district
People from Kurukshetra district
Haryana MLAs 2019–2024
Table tennis people
Indian sports executives and administrators